Iraq competed at the 2012 Summer Paralympics in London, United Kingdom from August 29 to September 9, 2012.

Medallists

Athletics 

Men's Track and Road Events

Men's Field Events

Powerlifting 

Men

Women

Shooting 

Women

Swimming 

Men

Table tennis 

Men

Wheelchair Fencing 

Men

Wheelchair Tennis

See also

 Iraq at the 2012 Summer Olympics

References

Nations at the 2012 Summer Paralympics
2012
2012 in Iraqi sport